Kirkheaton is a village and former civil parish, now in the parish of Capheaton, in the county of Northumberland, England. In 1951 the parish had a population of 70.

Governance 
Kirkheaton is in the parliamentary constituency of Hexham. On 1 April 1955 the parish was abolished and merged with Capheaton.

Landmarks 

Kirkheaton has a Pele tower.

The causeway is a Roman road which starts at Port Gate on Hadrian's Wall, north of Corbridge, and extends  northwards across Northumberland to the mouth of the River Tweed at Berwick-upon-Tweed.

Religious sites 
The church is dedicated to St Bartholomew. The chapel was rebuilt in 1775, at the expense of Mrs H. D. Windsor, at that time lady of the manor.

References

External links

GENUKI (accessed 19 November 2008)

Villages in Northumberland
Former civil parishes in Northumberland